The PBR theorem is a no-go theorem in quantum foundations due to Matthew Pusey, Jonathan Barrett, and Terry Rudolph (for whom the theorem is named) in 2012. It has particular significance for how one may interpret the nature of the quantum state.

With respect to certain realist hidden variable theories that attempt to explain the predictions of quantum mechanics, the theorem rules that pure quantum states must be "ontic" in the sense that they correspond directly to states of reality, rather than "epistemic" in the sense that they represent probabilistic or incomplete states of knowledge about reality.

The PBR theorem may also be compared with other no-go theorems like Bell's theorem and the Bell–Kochen–Specker theorem, which, respectively, rule out the possibility of explaining the predictions of quantum mechanics with local hidden variable theories and noncontextual hidden variable theories. Similarly, the PBR theorem could be said to rule out preparation independent hidden variable theories, in which quantum states that are prepared independently have independent hidden variable descriptions.

This result was cited by theoretical physicist Antony Valentini as "the most important general theorem relating to the foundations of quantum mechanics since Bell's theorem".

Theorem 
This theorem, which first appeared as an arXiv preprint and was subsequently published in Nature Physics, concerns the interpretational status of pure quantum states. Under the classification of hidden variable models of Harrigan and Spekkens, the interpretation of the quantum wavefunction  can be categorized as either ψ-ontic if "every complete physical state or ontic state in the theory is consistent with only one pure quantum state" and ψ-epistemic "if there exist ontic states that are consistent with more than one pure quantum state." The PBR theorem proves that either the quantum state  is ψ-ontic, or else non-entangled quantum states violate the assumption of preparation independence, which would entail action at a distance.

See also

 Quantum foundations
 Bell's theorem
 Kochen–Specker theorem

References

External links
 
 
 
 

Quantum information science
Theorems in quantum mechanics
Hidden variable theory
No-go theorems